Nosphistica cornutata is a moth in the family Lecithoceridae. It was described by Rose, Pathania and Sood in 2007. It is known from India.

References

Moths described in 2007
Nosphistica